Bournemouth railway station is the main railway station serving the seaside town of Bournemouth, Dorset, England. It was previously known as Bournemouth East (1885 to 1899) and then Bournemouth Central (1899 to 1967). It has long been treated as an obligatory stop (major stop) on the South West Main Line from London Waterloo to Weymouth.

A previous incarnation of Bournemouth East station was on another site. Ticket barriers were installed in 2008 and British Transport Police have a Bournemouth office at the station which acts as a regional hub.

History 

The station was designed by William Jacob, chief engineer of the London and South Western Railway, and opened on 20 July 1885 as Bournemouth East replacing the original station of the same name on the other side of Holdenhurst Road from 1870 to 1885, see Bournemouth East railway station (Ringwood, Christchurch and Bournemouth Railway). It was renamed Bournemouth Central on 1 May 1899 and became Bournemouth on 10 July 1967 following the closure of Bournemouth West. By 1967 third rail electrification had reached Bournemouth and continued beyond to Branksome and Bournemouth Train & Rolling Stock Maintenance Depot but no further. From the end of steam most trains were formed of 4REP EMUs coupled up with one or more unpowered 4TC units. The 4TC units would be uncoupled at Bournemouth and attached to a Class 33/1 diesel locomotive for the onward journey to Weymouth. This continued until the electrification of the line from Branksome to Weymouth and the introduction of Class 442 units in 1988. The end of steam also saw the removal of the station's centre tracks which ran between the up and down lines serving platforms 2 and 3 respectively and the demolition of the locomotive sheds to the west; the station car park took over their site.

The station roof was severely damaged by the Great Storm of 1987 that hit the South of England. It was extensively refurbished in 2000 by Railtrack after many years of disrepair and being surrounded by scaffolding to protect people from falling debris.

Ticket barriers were installed in 2008.

Bournemouth railway station was once served by services and goods deliveries across five railways, the South West Main Line, Southampton and Dorchester Railway, Ringwood, Christchurch and Bournemouth Railway, Salisbury and Dorset Junction Railway and Somerset and Dorset Joint Railway.

Accidents and incidents
On 2 September 1961, a train was derailed by trap points at the end of the down platform (towards the west).

Layout 
The station has four platforms:
Platform 1 – east facing bay platform capable of accommodating trains of up to four 20-metre coaches. As of May 2021, trains to Winchester depart from this platform.
Platform 2 – for through services to the east towards Southampton & London Waterloo
Platforms 3 and 4 – for terminating services from London & Manchester and through services to Weymouth, platform 4 is rarely used by trains in passenger service.
Platforms 3 and 4 are continuous, and both can accommodate full-length trains. This means Bournemouth has one of the longest platforms in the country. Other stations with this arrangement include Gloucester, Cambridge and Edinburgh Waverley.

Motive power depot

A small locomotive depot was opened at Bournemouth East in 1870, but closed in 1883. This was replaced by a larger shed, adjacent to Bournemouth Central station, in 1883. This in turn was supplemented by another shed nearby in 1888. In 1921, the 1883 shed was closed and the 1888 one was extended to increase capacity, and between 1936 and 1938 this was rebuilt and enlarged. The new shed included a  turntable and a  hoist. However the facilities remained cramped and awkwardly sited; there were proposals to move the depot to Branksome which were never implemented. This site therefore remained in use until June 1967 when the site was cleared.

Services

Rail 
The station is primarily served by South Western Railway, who operate fast and semi-fast trains from London Waterloo to Weymouth or Poole, and stopping services from Winchester to Bournemouth.

CrossCountry operate services from Bournemouth to Manchester Piccadilly via Birmingham New Street. All CrossCountry services at Bournemouth use Voyagers.

As of June 2021, the typical stopping pattern of the station are:
 Monday to Saturday:
 1 South Western Railway train per hour between Weymouth and London Waterloo, operating as a stopping service between Weymouth and Poole, and as a semi-fast service between Poole and Brockenhurst.
 1 South Western Railway train per hour between Poole and London Waterloo, stopping at all stations between Poole and Bournemouth before continuing as an express service to London. This service extends to Weymouth on Saturday as a semi-fast service west of Poole.
 1 South Western Railway train per hour between Bournemouth and Winchester, calling at most intermediate stations. This service extends to Poole, calling at all intermediate stations on Saturday.
 1 CrossCountry train every 2 hours between Bournemouth and Manchester via Southampton, Reading, and Birmingham.
 Sunday:
 1 South Western Railway train per hour between Weymouth and London Waterloo, stopping at all stations between Weymouth and Poole except Holton Heath and express thereafter.
 1 South Western Railway train per hour between Poole and London Waterloo, running non-stop between Poole and Bournemouth and stopping all the way to Southampton Central.
 1 CrossCountry train every 2 hours between Bournemouth and Manchester via Southampton, Reading, and Birmingham.

 

In May 1994, Network SouthEast extended its service London Victoria to Southampton service to terminate at Bournemouth. It was truncated back to Southampton in the 2000s by Southern. The service was one of the few regular services to use platform 1.

Bus 
Bournemouth railway station also serves as a hub for local bus services. On the down side of the station is Bournemouth Travel Interchange which is served by morebus, operating frequent buses to the town centre. A regular bus service to Bournemouth Airport, the 737, is operated by morebus. It is also a stop on National Express coach routes which serve the town. The station was also served by Yellow Buses until their collapse on the 4th August 2022.

Notes

References 

Railway stations in Bournemouth
Railway stations in Great Britain opened in 1885
Former London and South Western Railway stations
Railway stations served by CrossCountry
Railway stations served by South Western Railway
1885 establishments in England
DfT Category C1 stations